Aristot Tambwe-Kasengele (born 4 June 2004) is a DR Congo footballer who plays as a centre-back for Rapid Wien II.

Career statistics

Club

Notes

References

2004 births
Living people
Democratic Republic of the Congo footballers
Association football defenders
2. Liga (Austria) players
SK Rapid Wien players
Democratic Republic of the Congo expatriate footballers
Expatriate footballers in Austria
21st-century Democratic Republic of the Congo people